Tessellota cancellata is a moth in the family Erebidae. It was described by Hermann Burmeister in 1878. It is found in Argentina and Paraguay.

References

Moths described in 1878
Phaegopterina
Taxa named by Hermann Burmeister